The Torneo Plácido Galindo was played during the 1989 Copa América. The 42 football clubs were divided into 5 groups and the top teams advanced to the quarterfinals. Although Defensor Lima won the tournament, they qualified to Regional II's Liguilla Playoffs.

Teams

Results

Metropolitan zone

Group 1

Group 2

Group 3

Final Group

North zone

Group 1

Group 2

Group 3

Final Group

South zone

Group 1

Group 2

Final Group

Centre zone

Group 1

Group 2

Final Group

Oriental zone

Group A

Group B

Group C

Final Group

Bracket

Quarterfinals

|}

Semifinals

|}

Final

|}

External links
Peruvian Football Federation 
RSSSF

Peru
1989 in Peruvian football
Peruvian Primera División